Llywelyn Breese was a politician from the U.S. state of Wisconsin. He was born May 13, 1833 in Mallwyd, Merionethshire, Wales. He served as Wisconsin's tenth Secretary of State for two terms from January 3, 1870 to January 5, 1874. He was a Republican who served under governors Lucius Fairchild and Cadwallader C. Washburn. He resided in Portage, Wisconsin at the time of his election.

References 

Secretaries of State of Wisconsin
Wisconsin Republicans
American people of Welsh descent
1833 births
1922 deaths